The 39th National Assembly of Quebec consisted of those elected in the 2008 Quebec general election. It was in session from January 13, 2009 to February 22, 2011 and from February 23, 2011 to August 1, 2012. Jean Charest (Liberal) served as Premier and Pauline Marois (PQ) was the leader of the opposition.

Member list

Cabinet ministers are in bold, party leaders are in italic, and the president of the National Assembly is marked with a †.

Standings changes since the 39th general election

Cabinet Ministers

Source: 
 Premier and Executive Council President: Jean Charest
 Deputy Premier: Nathalie Normandeau (2008–2011), Line Beauchamp (2011–2012), Michelle Courchesne (2012-)
 House Leader: Jacques Dupuis (2008–2010), Jean-Marc Fournier (2010–)
 Deputy House Leader: Line Beauchamp (2008–2009), Robert Dutil (2010–)
 Agriculture, Fisheries and Food: Laurent Lessard (2008–2009), Claude Béchard (2009–2010), Laurent Lessard (2010–2011), Pierre Corbeil (2011–)
 Employment and Social Solidarity: Sam Hamad (2008–2010), Julie Boulet (2010–)
 Labour: David Whissell (2008–2009), Lise Thériault (2009–)
 Government Administration and President of the Treasury Board: Monique Gagnon-Tremblay (2008–2010), Michelle Courchesne (2010–)
 Government Services: Dominique Vien (2008–2010), Michelle Courchesne (2010–)
 Culture, Communications and Status of Women: Christine St-Pierre
 International Relations: Pierre Arcand (2008–2010), Monique Gagnon-Tremblay (2010–)
 Indian Affairs: Pierre Corbeil (2008–2011), Geoffrey Kelley (2011–)
 Canadian Francophonie: Pierre Arcand (2008–2010), Nathalie Normandeau (2010–2011), Yvon Vallières (2011–)
 Health and Social Services:  Yves Bolduc
 Delegate Minister to Social Services: Lise Thériault (2008–2010), Dominique Vien (2010–)
 Education, Recreation and Sports: Michelle Courchesne (2008–2010), Line Beauchamp (2010–2012), Michelle Courchesne (2012-)
 Immigration and Cultural Communities: Yolande James (2008–2010), Kathleen Weil (2010–)
 Seniors: Marguerite Blais
 Families: Tony Tomassi (2008–2010), Yolande James (2010–)
 Transportation: Julie Boulet (2008–2010), Sam Hamad (2010–2011), Pierre Moreau (2011–)
 Delegate Minister of Transportation: Norman MacMillan
 Infrastructures: Monique Jérôme-Forget (2008–2009), Monique Gagnon-Tremblay (2009–)
 Canadian Intergovernmental Affairs: Jacques Dupuis (2008–2009), Claude Béchard (2009–2010), Nathalie Normandeau (2010–2011), Yvon Vallières (2011–)
 Municipal Affairs, Regions and Land Occupancy: Nathalie Normandeau (2008–2009), Laurent Lessard (2009–)
 Democratic Institutions Reform and Access to Information: Jacques Dupuis (2008–2010), Jean-Marc Fournier (2010–2011), Yvon Vallières (2011–)
 Sustainable Development, Environment and Parks: Line Beauchamp (2008–2010), Pierre Arcand (2010–)
 Natural Resources and Wildlife: Claude Béchard (2008–2009), Nathalie Normandeau (2009–2011), Clément Gignac (2011–)
 Delegate Minister to Natural Resources and Wildlife: Serge Simard
 Justice: Kathleen Weil (2008–2010), Jean-Marc Fournier (2010–)
 Public Security: Jacques Dupuis (2008–2010), Robert Dutil (2010–)
 Finance: Monique Jérôme-Forget (2008–2009), Raymond Bachand (2009–)
 Revenue: Robert Dutil (2008–2010), Raymond Bachand (2010–)
 Tourism: Nicole Ménard
 Economic Development, Innovation and Export Trade: Raymond Bachand (2008–2009), Clément Gignac (2009–2011), Sam Hamad (2011–)

New electoral districts
An electoral map reform was made in 2011 and went into effect for the 2012 election.

The following electoral districts were created:
 Charlevoix–Côte-de-Beaupré
 Côte-du-Sud
 Drummond–Bois-Francs
 Granby
 Lotbinière-Frontenac
 Matane-Matapédia
 Mégantic
 Montarville
 Nicolet-Bécancour
 Repentigny
 Rivière-du-Loup–Témiscouata
 Sainte-Rose
 Saint-Jérôme
 Sanguinet
 Vanier-Les Rivières

The following electoral districts disappeared:
 Charlevoix
 Drummond
 Frontenac
 Kamouraska-Témiscouata
 Lotbinière
 Marguerite-D'Youville
 Matane
 Matapédia
 Mégantic-Compton
 Montmagny-L'Islet
 Nicolet-Yamaska
 Prévost
 Rivière-du-Loup
 Shefford
 Vanier

The following electoral district was renamed:
 Anjou was renamed Anjou–Louis-Riel; its territory was unchanged.

References

External links
 Élections/Map of Quebec electoral districts
 Jean Charest Cabinet
 List of Historical Cabinet ministers
 Seating Plan (in French)

38